Eccrita is a genus of moths of the family Noctuidae and is in the subfamily of Calpinae. The genus was erected by Julius Lederer in 1857. The genus was considered a synonym of Lygephila by Robert W. Poole, but it was revalidated by Herbert Beck in 1996.

If treated as a valid genus, it contains the species Eccrita ludicra Hübner, 1790, but many authors place it in Lygephila as Lygephila ludicra.

References

Calpinae